The 2016–17 season was Chesterfield's 150th season in their history and their third consecutive season in League One. Along with League One, the club participated in the FA Cup, League Cup and EFL Trophy.

The season covered the period from 1 July 2016 to 30 June 2017.

Players

Current squad

Out on loan

Transfers

Transfers in

Transfers out

Loans in

Loans out

Competitions

Pre-season friendlies

League One

League table

Matches

FA Cup

EFL Cup

EFL Trophy

Statistics

Appearances
Italics indicate loan player
Asterisk indicates player left club mid-season
Source: 

|}

Goalscorers

References

Chesterfield F.C. seasons
Chesterfield